Helvella cupuliformis is a species of fungi in the family Helvellaceae of the order Pezizales, described in 1966.

Description
A variant has been described from China, H. cupuliformis var. crassa that has larger fruit bodies and wider spores (18–21 by 12.5–15 μm).

Distribution
This species has been found in China, and Jalisco (Mexico).

References

cupuliformis
Fungi of Asia
Fungi of Europe
Fungi of North America
Taxa named by Henry Dissing
Taxa named by John Axel Nannfeldt